The 2014 Radivoj Korać Cup season was the 12th season of the Serbian national basketball cup tournament.

The competition started on February 6 and concluded with the Final on February 9, 2014.

Teams

Eight teams competed in this years cup.

Bracket

Quarterfinals

Semifinals

Final

References

External links
 Basketball Federation of Serbia 

2013-14
Radivoj
Serbia
Basketball in Belgrade